Luke Williams may refer to:

Luke Williams (wrestler) (born 1947), New Zealand professional wrestler
Luke Williams (author) (born 1977), Scottish author
Luke Williams (cricketer) (born 1979), Australian cricketer
Luke Williams (Australian rules footballer) (born 1979), Australian footballer
Luke Williams (soccer) (born 1983), American soccer player
Luke Williams (footballer, born 1981), English football player and manager
Luke Williams (footballer, born 1993), English footballer
Luke Williams (baseball) (born 1996), American baseball player
Luke Williams, drummer for Dead Letter Circus
Luke Williams (journalist), Australian journalist and author